Mademoiselle Josette, My Woman (French: Mademoiselle Josette, ma femme) is a French comic play written by Paul Gavault and Robert Charvay which premiered in 1906. Numerous film adaptations have been made of it.

References

Bibliography
 James L. Limbacher. Haven't I seen you somewhere before?: Remakes, sequels, and series in motion pictures and television, 1896-1978. Pierian Press, 1979.

French plays
1906 plays
French-language plays